The 1986–87 Idaho State Bengals men's basketball team represented Idaho State University during the 1986–87 NCAA Division I men's basketball season. Members of the Big Sky Conference, the Bengals were led by second-year head coach Jim Boutin and played their home games on campus at the ISU Minidome in Pocatello, Idaho.

At the conference tournament in Flagstaff, Arizona, they were seeded seventh and upset second-seeded Boise State by a point in the quarterfinal round.  semifinal the next night, Idaho State defeated sixth seed Idaho by nineteen and advanced to the final against fourth-seeded  and won 

In the 64-team NCAA tournament, ISU was seeded sixteenth in the West regional and met top-ranked UNLV  in   Down by nineteen points at halftime, they lost  and ended the season 

This was Idaho State's eleventh NCAA tournament appearance, but its first in ten years, and its most recent.

Postseason results

|-
!colspan=6 style=| Big Sky tournament

|-
!colspan=9 style=| NCAA tournament

References

External links
Sports Reference – Idaho State Bengals – 1986–87 basketball season

Idaho State Bengals men's basketball seasons
Idaho State
Idaho State
Idaho State